The Oiniwar dynasty, or Aainwar dynasty also known as the Sugauna dynasty, was a Maithil ruling dynasty of territories that form part of the Mithila region of the Indian subcontinent. They governed the area between 1325 and 1526, being preceded by the Karnat dynasty. Following the demise of the dynasty, emerged the dynasty of the Raj Darbhanga.

Origins
The rulers of the Oiniwar dynasty governed their lands between 1325 and 1526 however their rule from 1526 till 1526 have been not very well documented/fruitfuil. They were Srotiya Maithil Brahmins whose first significant figure was Jayapati Thakur. His grandson, Nath Thakur, served the local kings of the Karnat dynasty and was rewarded with a grant of the village of Oini in recognition of his scholarship. As was then customary, he took the name of the granted place as his own and the dynasty that followed from him became known as the Oiniwar. There is an alternative theory that the family were generally considered to be significant scholars and that this reputation and the influence that flowed from it resulted in them being awarded the village of Sodapura, which later caused them also to be known as the Srotiyas or Soit.

In 1325, following the collapse of the Karnat dynasty in 1324, Nath Thakur became the first Maithil ruler. The dynasty that followed him comprised a further 20 rulers. The recent studies and appearance of Aurangzed dictat from 1685 AD suggest that this family continued to be treated as King of Mithila and the Khandwalas were subordinate to them. It was not until the early 18th century that the Khandwalas became prominent and were recognised as King by AliVardi Khan.

Capitals
The dynastic capitals were frequently relocated. At some unknown time, it was moved from Oini in present-day Muzaffarpur district to the village of Sugauna in modern-day Madhubani district, thus giving rise to the rulers also being known as the Sugauna Dynasty. It was moved again, to Devakuli, during the reign of Deva Singh, and then to Gajarathpura (also known as Shiva Singhpura) during the early years of the reign of his son, Shiva Singh. When the latter died in 1416, his queen, Lakshima, governed for 12 years and then was succeeded by his brother, Padma Singh, who moved the capital once more. Named Padma, after its founder, this was near to Rajnagar and a long way from the previous seat. Padma Singh, who ruled for three years, was succeeded by his wife, Vivasa Devi, and she, too, founded a new capital which is today the village of Vishual.

Military
The military of the Oiniwar dynasty was considered to be the main pillar of the King's power. The army was under the command of a senapati or the commander-in-chief who had direct control of the military. The military had a four-fold structure with infantry, cavalry, elephants and chariots. The poet, Vidyapati who worked in the court of the Oiniwars, noted that the core of the army consisted of Kshatriyas and Brahmins the vanguard consisted of mercenaries from Kurukshetra, Matsya, Surasena and Panchala.

In a battle with a Muslim Sultan during the reign of King Sivasimha, many different warriors were mentioned including Commander Suraja, Śri Śakho Sanehi Jha, Pundamalla who was an expert in archery and Rajadeva (Raut) who was considered to be a matchless warrior.

Culture
The frequent moving of capitals and also the founding of new villages resulted in a range of new infrastructure financed by the dynasty, taking such forms as roads, temples, ponds and forts. In addition, the rulers were significant patrons of Maithili culture. Their era has been called the epitome of the Maithili language. The contributions of the poet and scholar Vidyapati, who flourished during the reign of Shiva Simha Singh, are particularly notable. This was a significant change from the Karnat era, whose rulers were not native to the area and which had been culturally stagnant.

Sugauna became the core of linguistic and philosophical development of the Hindu religion.

Demise
The last of the Oiniwar rulers was Laxminath Singh Deva.. He had been trying to assert himself as an independent ruler and in the process was killed by Nusrat Shah of Bengal. Following Laxminath Singh Deva death there was a period of lawlessness in the region lasting around 30 years where various Rajput, Brahmin, Kayastha clans were battling for power. After this emerged the dynasty of the Raj Darbhanga.

Rulers
According to historian Makhan Jha, the rulers of the Oiniwar dynasty are as follows:
 
 Nath Thakur
 Atirupa Thakur
 Vishwarupa Thakur
 Govinda Thakur
 Lakshman Thakur
 Kameshwar Thakur
 Bhogishwar Thakur, ruled for over 33 years
 Ganeshwar Singh, reigned from 1355; killed by his cousins in 1371 after a long-running internecine dispute
 Kirti Singh
 Bhava Singh Deva
 Deva Simha Singh
 Shiva Simha Singh (or Shivasimha Rūpanārāyana), took power in 1402, missing in battle in 1406
 Lakshima Devi, chief wife of Shiva Simha Singh, ruled as regent for 12 years. She committed sati after many years of waiting for her husband's return.
 Padma Simha Singh, took power in 1418 and died in 1431
 Viswavasa Devi, wife of Padma Singh, died in 1443
 Hara Singh Deva, younger brother of Deva Singh
 Nara Singh Deva, died in 1460
 Dhir Singh Deva
 Bhairva Singh Deva, died in 1515, brother of Dhir Singh Deva
 Rambhadra Deva
 Laxminath Singh Deva, died in 1526
 Rupnarayan Deva 1526 onwards  

Jha also refers to the predecessors of Nath Thakur used as "kings" but this contradicts his own explanation of when the family became rulers. Those predecessors are Jayapati Thakur and Hingu Thakur.

See also
History of Mithila Region

References
Notes

Citations

History of Bihar
Culture of Mithila
Kingdoms of Bihar
Dynasties of India
14th-century establishments in Nepal
16th-century disestablishments in Nepal